Chợ Mới may refer to several places in Vietnam, including:

Chợ Mới District, An Giang 
Chợ Mới - township and seat of the district
Chợ Mới District, Bắc Kạn, a district in Bắc Kạn Province